Elena Kazan is a German-Russian actress who appears in German as well as Indian films such as Agent Vinod, John Day, Prague etc. The German-Philippine, English film 'Ruined Heart' in which Kazan plays the leading female role was released in March 2015. She has featured as a houseguest in the Bigg Boss house.

Personal life
Kazan was born as Elena Kazan in Moscow, Russia, to German parents. Her mother is a nurse and her father was a primary school teacher. She spent her childhood in Ukraine before moving to Berlin with her family. At the age of 16, she moved to the US for higher studies. Kazan later went to India to work with a volunteer organization in Kolkata and while there taught the German language at Max Mueller Bhavan. She traveled widely in India for the first three years.

Career

Kazan worked in Kolkata with the Indo-German Chamber of Commerce as an interpreter. She also worked as a Unit Hand in an Australian short film shot in Kolkata, during which time she got the opportunity to work in a Bengali film. Kazan started her acting career with the 2010 Bengali film 'Clerk' opposite Prosenjit Chatterjee. The next year in 2011, Kazan acted in the drama film Gandhi to Hitler. In 2012, Kazan had a cameo role in the film Agent Vinod. But her first big role came in the 2013 film John Day in which she plays the role of Tabassum Habibi, a chronic alcoholic with a dark and complex past. In the same year 2013, Kazan played the role of a Czech gypsy girl in Prague, who comes to India in search of her identity. Her next film was AASMA in which she plays the role of a Kashmiri girl. Her career went international in 2014, when she co-starred in the German-Philippine, English film 'Ruined Heart'.

Bigg Boss 10
Kazan entered the Colors popular show Bigg Boss 10 as a wild card entrant. She entered along with Jason Shah, Sahil Anand and Priyanka Jagga. She got evicted a week after staying inside the house.

Filmography

Television

References

External links

 

Living people
Actresses from Moscow
Actresses from Berlin
German film actresses
Russian film actresses
Actresses in Hindi cinema
Actresses in Bengali cinema
Bigg Boss (Hindi TV series) contestants
Russian people of German descent
German expatriates in India
Russian expatriates in India
European actresses in India
Actresses of European descent in Indian films
Year of birth missing (living people)
21st-century German actresses